Niesky  (Sorbian and) is a small town in Upper Lusatia in eastern Saxony, Germany. It has a population of about 9,200 (2020) and is part of the district of Görlitz.

Historically considered part of Upper Lusatia, it was also part of Lower Silesia from 1815 to 1945.

History
The town was founded in 1742 by Moravian immigrants. As members of the Moravian Church, they fled from persecution in their Catholic homeland. The name Niesky is the Germanised version of the Czech word nízký ("low").

In 1776, at the age of 12, Benjamin Henry Boneval Latrobe, future designer of the United States Capitol, as well as of the Baltimore Basilica, was sent to the Moravian School at Niesky.

Niesky was administered by the Moravian Church until 1892, when a separate civil administration was established. In 1931 it obtained a coat of arms, and in 1935 it was granted town rights. In 1935 a Catholic church was opened.

In 1926 the architect Konrad Wachsmann worked in the timber construction firm Christoph & Unmack AG.

During World War II, the Germans established and operated the AL Niesky subcamp of the Gross-Rosen concentration camp, whose prisoners were mostly Poles, Russians, Jews and Yugoslavs, but also Czechs and Frenchmen, and hundreds of whom died. The Germans evacuated the prisoners in February 1945, leaving only those unable to walk in the camp. During the march, weak prisoners and those unable to continue walking were murdered by the Germans and buried in forests along the way. The prisoners remaining in the camp were liberated by the Polish Second Army which captured the town on April 18, 1945. On July 26, 1945, the city issued three postage stamps of its own.

Localities
Localities of Niesky are Neuhof, Neusärchen, Neuödernitz, Ödernitz, See, Zeche-Moholz, Kosel, Zedlig and Sandschänke.

Twin town 
Niesky is twinned with the French town of Albert.

Gallery

References 

 
Populated places established in 1742
Towns in Görlitz (district)
History of the European Continental Province of the Moravian Church
Settlements of the Moravian Church